Heben Nigatu is an Ethiopian-American writer and the former co-host of BuzzFeed podcast Another Round which stopped broadcasting in 2017. She previously wrote for The Late Show with Stephen Colbert and is currently a staff writer for Desus & Mero on Showtime.

Early life and education 
Nigatu was born in Ethiopia.

She grew up in Northern Virginia and attended Columbia University before leaving to join BuzzFeed.

Career 
Nigatu began working at BuzzFeed first on a three-month fellowship while still a student, then joined the full-time staff.

Another Round 

In March 2015, Nigatu and co-host Tracy Clayton launched BuzzFeed podcast Another Round. The Onion A.V. Club described Nigatu and Clayton as "funny and insightful hosts, bringing their infectious personalities to conversations that range from squirrels to self-care to microaggressions in the workplace." The Guardian called them "the smartest, funniest women in the room and everyone wants to sit at their table"; likewise writing for The Guardian, critic Sasha Frere-Jones described Clayton and Nigatu "leading American cultural critics." In its first year, Another Round was rated by iTunes, Slate, Vulture, and The Atlantic as a "Best of 2015" podcast.

In late 2017, Nigatu and Clayton announced that BuzzFeed had decided to stop producing Another Round, but the two hosts were granted ownership of the show and plan to continue it outside BuzzFeed, after a hiatus.

Post-BuzzFeed 
In April 2016, after three and a half years working for BuzzFeed, Nigatu announced she was moving to The Late Show with Stephen Colbert, but would continue hosting Another Round. She continued at The Late Show until January 2017.

On 15 February 2019, it was announced that Nigatu was a staff writer for Desus & Mero, the comedy duo's 2019 late night show on Showtime.

#CarefreeBlackKids2k16 
In the wake of the 2016 police shootings of Alton Sterling and Philando Castile, Nigatu created the hashtag #CarefreeBlackKids2k16. Blavity described the photos and videos accompanying the hashtag "the bright light we needed after this troubling week."

Honors 

 Forbes, 30 Under 30 (2016)
 Fast Company, Most Creative People (2016)
 The Root, The Root 100 (2016)

Personal life 
Nigatu lives in Brooklyn.

See also 
 Carefree Black Girls

References

External links
Heben Nigatu on Twitter
"What It Means to be Unapologetically Black – Heben Nigatu and Tracy Clayton on PBS Newshour's "Brief but Spectacular"

Year of birth missing (living people)
Living people
American podcasters
American television writers
BuzzFeed people
American people of Ethiopian descent
Columbia College (New York) alumni